The Last Angry Man is a 1959 drama film that tells the story of a television producer who profiles the life of a physician. It stars Paul Muni (in his last film appearance), David Wayne, Betsy Palmer, Billy Dee Williams (in his film debut), and Godfrey Cambridge.

The movie was scripted by Richard Murphy from the novel by Gerald Green (who also adapted it), and was directed by Daniel Mann.

The movie was nominated for the Academy Award for Best Actor (Paul Muni) and Best Art Direction-Set Decoration, Black-and-White (Carl Anderson, William Kiernan).

The film was remade in 1974 as an ABC Movie of the Week with Pat Hingle in the lead role.

Plot
As the fiercely dedicated general practitioner who tries to help the sick, the poor, and the unfortunate in his decrepit neighborhood, Dr. Sam Abelman is a testy old man who faces life without compromise and Woodrow Thrasher is a troubled television executive fighting to preserve his career.

Cast
 Paul Muni as Dr. Samuel "Sam" Abelman
 David Wayne as Woodrow "Woody" Thrasher
 Betsy Palmer as Anna Thrasher
 Luther Adler as Dr. Max Vogel
 Claudia McNeil as Mrs. Quincy
 Joby Baker as Myron Malkin
 Joanna Moore as Alice Taggart
 Nancy R. Pollock as Sarah Abelman
 Billy Dee Williams as Josh Quincy
 Robert F. Simon as Lyman Gatting
 Dan Tobin as Ben Loomer

Reception
Paul S. Cowan of The Harvard Crimson wrote that the film "combines some of the finest motion picture effects with many of the worst."

Variety wrote that the lead actor "gives a superlative performance."

See also
 List of American films of 1959

References

External links

1959 drama films
1959 films
American drama films
Columbia Pictures films
American black-and-white films
Films scored by George Duning
Films about physicians
Films about television
Films based on American novels
Films directed by Daniel Mann
Films set in Brooklyn
1950s English-language films
1950s American films